São Pedro da Aldeia is a municipality in Brazil. Its population was 106,049 (2020) and its area is 340 km2.

Geography
It lies in the east of Rio de Janeiro State on the Araruama Lagoon, 120 km from the state capital, Rio de Janeiro. The Araruama lagoon is the largest hypersaline lagoon in the world. Sports like windsurfing, kitesurfing and others like these are common because of the wind force in São Pedro da Aldeia

Economy
Salt extraction and fishing are the two most important industries.

History
São Pedro da Aldeia was founded in 1660 by Catholic priests on the top of a hill named after Saint Peter, in honor of whom the city was named. A chapel was built that was later replaced by an architecturally significant church. Nowadays it is the main historical monument in the town and is protected by state laws. Some colonial buildings and landmarks remain today, such as the cemetery beside the church, where the family graves of the founders of the town remain.  In the 1960s the Brazilian Air Force and Navy built a military airport there, bringing many migrants from others parts of the country and increasing the town's population.

References

External links
Previspa - Official Web Site of Public Servants of the city
São Pedro da Aldeia City Council - Official Web Site of the São Pedro da Aldeia City Council
Rio Notícias Agora-São Pedro da Aldeia - News About São Pedro da Aldeia
Visit São Pedro da Aldeia - São Pedro da Aldeia Tourism Web Site
Others:
Map of São Pedro da Aldeia
Pictures of São Pedro da Aldeia

Municipalities in Rio de Janeiro (state)
Populated places established in 1660
1660 establishments in the Portuguese Empire